HMS Restless was an  destroyer which served with the Royal Navy during World War I. Launched on 12 August 1916, the ship operated as part of the Grand Fleet, operating as part of a destroyer flotilla protecting convoys in the North Sea. After the War, the destroyer served in the Mediterranean Sea and was sold to be broken up on 23 November 1936.

Design and development

Restless was one of seventeen  destroyers ordered by the British Admiralty in July 1915 as part of the Sixth War Construction Programme. Three funnels were fitted.

Armament consisted of three  Mk IV QF guns on the ship's centreline, with one on the forecastle, one aft on a raised platform and one between the second and third funnels. A single 2-pounder (40 mm) pom-pom anti-aircraft gun was carried, while torpedo armament consisted of two twin mounts for  torpedoes.  The ship had a complement of 82 officers and ratings.

Construction and career
Restless was laid down by John Brown & Company at Clydebank on the River Clyde on 22 September 1915 and launched on 12 August 1916, leaving the yard on 21 October that year. The destroyer was allocated the yard number 451. Total build time was 324 days, with 70 days spent at the yard in fit-out.

On commissioning, Restless joined the 15th Destroyer Flotilla of the Grand Fleet and served there until 1919. The Flotilla was involved in supporting the convoys that crossed the North Sea, including taking part in anti-submarine patrols between 15 and 24 June 1917. Although sixty-one sightings of submarines and twelve attacks were reported during that operation, no submarines were sunk. On 24 April 1918 the Flotilla was called to intercept the High Seas Fleet on what was to prove the last expedition by the German Navy of the War.

After the War, Restless was stationed in Gibraltar as part of the local defence flotilla. On 23 November 1936, the destroyer was given to Thos. W. Ward of Sheffield in exchange for RMS Majestic and was subsequently broken up at Briton Ferry.

Pennant numbers

References

Citations

Bibliography

 
 
 
 
 
 
 

1916 ships
Ships built on the River Clyde
R-class destroyers (1916)
World War I destroyers of the United Kingdom